The 1832 United States presidential election in Georgia took place between November 2 and December 5, 1832, as part of the 1832 United States presidential election. Voters chose 11 representatives, or electors to the Electoral College, who voted for President and Vice President.

Georgia voted unanimously for the Democratic Party candidate, Andrew Jackson.

Results

References

Georgia
1832
1832 Georgia (U.S. state) elections